Freeman and Lockyer v Buckhurst Park Properties (Mangal) Ltd [1964] 2 QB 480 is a UK company law case, concerning the enforceability of obligations against a company.

Facts
Mr Freeman and Mr Lockyer sued Buckhurst Park Ltd and its director, Shiv Kumar Kapoor, for unpaid fees for their architecture work on developing the ‘Buckhurst Park Estate’ in Sunninghill, Berkshire. The company’s articles said that all four directors of the company (another Mr Hoon, who was never there, and two nominees) were needed to constitute a quorum. Originally the company planned to simply buy and resell the land, but that fell through. Kapoor had acted alone (as if he were a managing director) in engaging the architects, without proper authority. The company argued it was not bound by the agreement.

Judge Herbert at Westminster County Court held the company was bound, and the company appealed.

Judgment
Diplock LJ held the judge was right and the company was bound to pay Freeman and Lockyer for their architecture work. He noted that if actual authority is conferred by the board without a formal resolution, this renders the board liable for a fine. If a person has no actual authority to act on a company's behalf, then a contract can still be enforced if an agent had authority to enter contracts of a different but similar kind, the person granting that authority itself had authority, the contracting party was induced by these representations to enter the agreement and the company had the capacity to act. All those conditions were fulfilled on the facts, because (1) the board knew about Kapoor’s general activities and permitted him to engage in these kinds of activities; such conduct represented his authority to contract for these kinds of things (2) the articles conferred full power to the board (3) Freeman and Lockyer were induced to contract by these ‘representations’ and (4) the company had capacity.

See also

UK company law
Agency in English law

Notes

References

United Kingdom company case law
Court of Appeal (England and Wales) cases
1964 in case law
1954 in British law